Grand Island is an unincorporated community in Colusa County, California, on the Sacramento River. It lies at an elevation of 33 feet (10 m).

References

External links 

Unincorporated communities in California
Unincorporated communities in Colusa County, California